Elmer Ellsworth Brown (1861–1934) was an American educator.

Biography
Born at Kiantone in Chautauqua County, New York, Elmer Ellsworth Brown studied at New York University (NYU), graduated from Illinois State Normal University in 1881 and at the University of Michigan (A.B., 1889); then he studied in Germany and received a Ph.D. from the University of Halle in 1890.

He married Fanny Fosten Eddy on June 29, 1889.

He was principal of public schools in Belvidere, Illinois, in 1881-84, assistant state secretary of the YMCA of Illinois (1884–87), and principal of the high school at Jackson, Michigan, in 1890–91. He taught education at the University of Michigan (1891–93) and at the University of California, Berkeley (1893–1906). After directing the reorganization of the United States Bureau of Education as U.S. Commissioner of Education (1906–11), he became chancellor of New York University, where he founded NYU Press in 1916 "to publish contributions to higher learning by eminent scholars."

He was made fellow of the American Academy of Arts and Sciences and vice president of the education section in 1907. He led the Andiron Club from 1916 to 1922 and was associated with the Eucleian Society. Brown retired from NYU in 1933 and died in 1934 in New York.

Works

His works include: 
The Making of Our Middle Schools (1903).
The Origin of American State Universities (1905).
Government by Influences, and Other Addresses (1909).
An Efficient Organization and Enlarged Scope for the Bureau of Education (1910).
''A Few Remarks (1933).

Notes

Sources

External links
 
NYU University Archives

1861 births
1934 deaths
Fellows of the American Academy of Arts and Sciences
Illinois State University alumni
New York University alumni
People from Chautauqua County, New York
Presidents of New York University
United States Bureau of Education people
University of California, Berkeley faculty
University of Halle alumni
University of Michigan alumni
University of Michigan faculty